The  is a compilation CD box set released on 11 July 1988 featuring all of the opening and ending theme songs from the anime television series Maison Ikkoku, and the theme song from the Maison Ikkoku theatrical movie. This box set is one of only three Maison Ikkoku music collections containing the theme song Hidamari by Kōzō Murashita, so this set is considered more collectable as a result.

Description 
The Maison Ikkoku CD Single Memorial File is contained in a large LP-sized hard slipcase with two pull-out hardcover folders. The first contains nine of the 8 cm CD singles, and the second contains four CD singles along with an adapter for playing the 8 cm CDs in CD players which can only handle the standard 12 cm CDs (such as slot-drives for which the 8 cm CD single format is too small).

The inside of each folder features "film strip"-style summaries of the opening and ending credits used throughout the anime series. The outside cover of each folder features full color group scenes of the characters from the series.

The insert shows the covers of all the CD singles represented in this collection, as well as the complete lyrics for each song. A track listing is included on the back of the insert, listing the title, artist, date of release, record label, which episodes used the song, and the date range of those episodes.

Track listing 

Sources:

References 

Maison Ikkoku
Anime soundtracks
1998 compilation albums
1998 soundtrack albums
Film soundtracks